Broby can mean:

Broby municipality in Denmark
Nørre Broby - a town in Broby municipality
Broby, Sweden -  a town in Östra Göinge, Sweden
Broby bro Runestones, a group of runestones in Sweden